George Albert Newberry  (6 March 1917 – 29 December 1978) was a track cyclist from Great Britain.

Newberry was born in the Burton on Trent area of Staffordshire.  He represented his country at the 1952 Summer Olympics in Helsinki, Finland. There he won the bronze medal in the 4.000m team pursuit, alongside Donald Burgess, Alan Newton, and Ronald Stretton.

References

External links
 
 

1917 births
1978 deaths
English track cyclists
English male cyclists
Cyclists at the 1952 Summer Olympics
Olympic cyclists of Great Britain
Olympic bronze medallists for Great Britain
Sportspeople from Burton upon Trent
Olympic medalists in cycling
Medalists at the 1952 Summer Olympics